Amerasekera is a Sinhalese surname.

Notable people
 Ajith Amerasekera, Sri Lankan engineer
 Rohan Amerasekera (1916–1974), Ceylonese navy officer
 Vijitha Amerasekera (born 1961), Sri Lankan athlete

See also
 

Sinhalese surnames